Kryukovskaya is a rural locality (a village) in Saminskoye Rural Settlement, Vytegorsky District, Vologda Oblast, Russia. The population was 14 as of 2002.

Geography 
Kryukovskaya is located 43 km north of Vytegra (the district's administrative centre) by road. Titovo is the nearest rural locality.

References 

Rural localities in Vytegorsky District